Giovanni Ser di Mocenigo, Jr. (1409 – November 4, 1485), Pietro Mocenigo's brother, was doge of Venice from 1478 to 1485. He fought at sea against the Ottoman Sultan Mehmed II and on land against Ercole I d'Este, duke of Ferrara, from whom he recaptured Rovigo and the Polesine. He was interred in the Basilica di Santi Giovanni e Paolo, a traditional burial place of the doges. His dogaressa was Taddea Michiel (d. 1479), who was to be the last dogaressa to be crowned in Venice until Zilia Dandolo in 1557, almost a century later.

Popular culture
In the video game Assassin's Creed II, Giovanni Mocenigo is poisoned by the fictional consigliere and Council of Ten member Carlo Grimaldi, which leads to Marco Barbarigo being installed as doge. This fictionalization was actually based on real-life speculations that Giovanni Mocenigo was poisoned.

See also
Mocenigo family

References

1409 births
1485 deaths
Giovanni
Republic of Venice people of the Ottoman–Venetian Wars
15th-century Doges of Venice
Burials at Santi Giovanni e Paolo, Venice